The following is a list of films produced in the Kannada film industry in India in 1969, presented in alphabetical order.

See also
Kannada films of 1968
Kannada films of 1970

References

External links
 Kannada Movies of 1969's at the Internet Movie Database
 http://www.bharatmovies.com/kannada/info/moviepages.htm
 http://www.kannadastore.com/

1969
Kannada
Films, Kannada